Claudia Lynn Cohen (December 16, 1950 – June 15, 2007) was an American gossip columnist, socialite, and television reporter. She is credited with putting the New York Post's Page Six gossip column on the map. The building housing the University of Pennsylvania's College of Arts and Sciences was renamed in her honor in 2008.

Early life and education
Claudia Cohen was born to a Jewish family, the daughter of Harriet (née Brandwein) and businessman Robert B. Cohen, the founder of Hudson News and the president of the Hudson County News Company, a magazine wholesaler.   She grew up in Englewood, New Jersey, and attended the Dwight School for Girls (now the Dwight-Englewood School) and the University of Pennsylvania.

Journalism career
In 1976, she joined the New York Post as a reporter for its fledgling gossip column Page Six. She succeeded Neal Travis as editor of Page Six in 1978. Noted for going for the jugular, and creating a column with savvy and a sharp edge, Cohen is credited with putting Page Six on the map. Cohen left the Post in 1980 to start her own short-lived gossip column, I, Claudia (a play on words of the book title I, Claudius) at a rival newspaper, the New York Daily News. While that column was not a success, it did maintain Cohen's profile. Cohen was a regular on Live with Regis and Kelly and an active member of the Manhattan and Hamptons social scene.

Death
Cohen died on June 15, 2007 from ovarian cancer.

Personal life
In 1984, Cohen began a relationship with businessman Ronald Perelman. The two married in 1985, and had one daughter, Samantha.  After nine years, the couple divorced, and Cohen reportedly received a settlement of $80,000,000 (eighty million U.S. dollars).

Cohen later dated former U.S. senator from New York state, Al D'Amato.

At the request of Ronald Perelman, the University of Pennsylvania renamed the historic Logan Hall, sitting next to College Hall and originally named after James Logan, secretary to William Penn, "Claudia Cohen Hall," much to the surprise and dismay of some Penn faculty, alumni, and students. The rear of the newly renamed building overlooks Perelman Quadrangle.

References

External links
 New York Observer article about Claudia Cohen's funeral

1950 births
2007 deaths
American socialites
Television personalities from New York City
American women television personalities
American women journalists
Jewish American journalists
Deaths from ovarian cancer
Dwight-Englewood School alumni
People from Englewood, New Jersey
The Daily Pennsylvanian people
Deaths from cancer in New York (state)
New York Post people
20th-century American women
20th-century American people
20th-century American Jews
21st-century American Jews
21st-century American women